is a Japanese actor. He won the award for Best Newcomer at the 3rd Hochi Film Awards for Kaerazaru hibi  and for Best Actor at the 6th Hochi Film Awards for Enrai.

Selected filmography

Film
Kaerazaru hibi (1978)
Third Base (1978)
The Incident (1978)
The Battle of Port Arthur (1980) as Yasusuke Nogi
Nichiren (1979) as Nikkō Shōnin
Enrai (1981)
Kofuku (1981)
Imperial Navy (1981)
Theater of Life (1983)
Mishima: A Life in Four Chapters (1985)Tokei – Adieu l'hiver (1986)Godzilla vs. Biollante (1989)Manatsu no Chikyū (1991)Yearning (1993)Nastasja (1994)A Last Note (1995)Gamera 2: Attack of Legion (1996)Godzilla vs. Megaguirus (2000)Pyrokinesis (2000)Platonic Sex (2001)Thway (2003)125 Years Memory (2015) as Yutaka NomuraSakura Guardian in the North (2018)Threads: Our Tapestry of Love (2020) as Shōzō KirinoNobutora (2020) as Takeda Shingen and Takeda NobukadoMio's Cookbook (2020)Beautiful Lure (2021)

Television
 Shishi no Jidai (1980) as Kozo Hiranuma
 Mōri Motonari (1997) as Akagawa Motoyasu
 Musashi (2004) as Yagyū Toshikatsu
 Fūrin Kazan (2007) as Murakami Yoshikiyo
 BG Personal Bodyguard (2018) as Shigenobu Imazeki
 Idaten (2019) as Chiyosaburō Takeda
 The Grand Family (2021) as Ichirō Ōkawa
 Taiga Drama ga Umareta Hi'' (2023) as Mitsuo Yamaoka

References

External links

1956 births
Japanese male actors
Living people
People from Chiba (city)